Aman Khujeh (also Romanized as Amān Khūjeh and Amān Khvojeh; also known as Amān Khājeh) is a village in Kongor Rural District, in the Central District of Kalaleh County, Golestan Province, Iran. At the 2006 census, its population was 400, in 87 families.

References 

Populated places in Kalaleh County